Radio Cape Cod is a 2008 film directed and produced by Andrew Silver. It stars Tamzin Outhwaite as a radio interviewer coming to terms with the loss of her husband and a new love entering her life. She also must cope with her teenage daughter, played by Tamzin Merchant, who is experiencing her first love. The film also stars O. T. Fagbenle. The film won several festival awards.

Plot 
The main character, Jill Waters, is an NPR radio show host who also performs wedding nuptials.  The story involves three couples in love, and a wedding that takes place over a five-day period in the seaside community of Cape Cod. The film explores the joys and challenges of motherhood with new beginnings, life and love.

Critical reception
Reviews

Susan Waugh, reviewing for STLBeacon.org writes, "Radio Cape Cod is a triple love story set on the beaches of Cape Cod, Massachusetts. With gorgeous scenery and beautiful people, it's as relaxing and refreshing as a day on the beach - and uplifting to boot."

Awards

 Best Feature Film - Wellfleet Harbor Actors Theater, Wellfleet Mass
 Best Cinematography - 2008 All American Film Festival, Durham NC 
 Best Cinematography - 2008 Schweitzer Lakedance Film Festival, Sandpoint, ID
 Best International Feature Film - 2008 End of the Pier International Film Festival, Sussex England
 Best Actress Tamzin Outhwaite - 2008 End of the Pier International Film Festival, Sussex England

References

External links
 
 

2008 films
2008 romantic drama films
American romantic drama films
2000s American films